Marek Jungr (born 11 April 1987) is a former Czech football player who lastly played for FC Vysočina Jihlava. He has represented his country at youth international level.

In September 2011, Jungr moved on loan to Jihlava until the end of the calendar year.

References

External links
 
 

1987 births
Living people
Czech footballers
Czech First League players
1. FK Příbram players
AC Sparta Prague players
Bohemians 1905 players
FC Vysočina Jihlava players
FK Teplice players
SK Dynamo České Budějovice players
People from Strakonice
Association football midfielders
FC Sellier & Bellot Vlašim players
Czech National Football League players
Sportspeople from the South Bohemian Region